The 1988 ADAC 1000 km Nürburgring was the eighth round of the 1988 World Sportscar Championship season.  It took place at the Nürburgring, West Germany on September 3 and 4, 1988.

Pre-race 
Prior to the race weekend, the Allgemeiner Deutscher Automobil-Club (ADAC), organisers of the event, decided to alter the schedule for the race weekend as well as the format of the race itself.

Rather than being a continual six hour event, the race was broken into two heats. The first heat was to be run on Saturday evening, going from dusk into darkness, and running for three hours of 500 kilometres, whichever was achieved first. The second heat would then be run on Sunday afternoon for an equal distance to make up the 1000 kilometre total distance. The times from each entry would be combined from the two events in order to determine an overall winner.

Several teams and drivers protested this change, in part due to the rain and fog present on the race weekend. All teams however did race any way.

Official results 
These results show the combined times from both heats.  Class winners in bold. Cars failing to complete 75% of the winner's distance marked as Not Classified (NC).

Statistics
 Pole Position - #61 Team Sauber Mercedes - 1:24.920
 Fastest Lap - #61 Team Sauber Mercedes - 1:28.550
 Average Speed - 154.359 km/h

References

 

N
6 Hours of Nürburgring
Nurburgring 1000